The AEW TNT Championship is a men's professional wrestling television championship created and promoted by the American promotion All Elite Wrestling (AEW). Established on March 30, 2020, it is named after the TNT television network, which currently airs AEW's secondary core program, Rampage, as well as the promotion's Battle of the Belts quarterly television specials. 

Cody Rhodes, then known simply as Cody, was the inaugural champion. He is also tied with Sammy Guevara for the most reigns at three. Darby Allin's first reign is the longest at 186 days and he also has the longest combined reign at 214 days, while Wardlow's second reign is the shortest at 3 days. Allin is also the youngest champion at the age of 27, while Samoa Joe was the oldest, winning the title at 43. Powerhouse Hobbs is the current champion in his first reign. He defeated Wardlow by technical knockout in a Falls Count Anywhere match on the March 8, 2023, episode of Dynamite in Sacramento, California.

Title history

Combined reigns

References

External links
 Official AEW TNT Championship Title History
 

 
All Elite Wrestling championships
Television wrestling championships
TNT (American TV network)